Chrysanympha is a genus of moths of the family Noctuidae.

Species
 Chrysanympha formosa Grote, 1865

References
 Chrysanympha at Markku Savela's Lepidoptera and Some Other Life Forms
 Natural History Museum Lepidoptera genus database

Plusiinae